Douglas Claydon Van Horn (born June 24, 1944) is a former American football offensive lineman in the National Football League for the Detroit Lions and New York Giants.  He played college football at Ohio State University and was named first-team All-American in 1965.  Van Horn was drafted in the fourth round of the 1966 NFL Draft.  He was also selected in the fifth round of the 1966 AFL Draft by the Kansas City Chiefs. He earned the Giants starting right guard spot in 1969, playing in that role until he was switched to right tackle in 1974.

References

External links
 Doug Van Horn at Pro Football Archives
 

1944 births
Living people
American football offensive linemen
Detroit Lions players
New York Giants players
Ohio State Buckeyes football players
Sportspeople from Sedalia, Missouri
Players of American football from Missouri
Atlantic Coast Football League players